The Cuban vireo (Vireo gundlachii) is a species of bird in the family Vireonidae that is endemic to Cuba.  Its natural habitats are dry forests, lowland moist forests, xeric shrublands, and heavily degraded former forest.

Its specific name is in honor of Cuban zoologist Juan Gundlach.

References

Cuban Viero
Endemic birds of Cuba
Cuban vireo
Cuban vireo
Taxonomy articles created by Polbot